{{Infobox military unit
| unit_name                     = The Prince Edward Island Highlanders
| country                       = Canada
| type                          = Line infantry
| branch                        = 
| dates                         = 1875–1946
| specialization                = Infantry
| command_structure             = 
| size                          = One battalion
| garrison                      = Charlottetown, Prince Edward Island
| motto                         = 
| colors                        = Facing colour blue
| march                         = Quick – Highland Laddie
| mascot                        = 
| battles                       = 
| battle_honours                = See #Battle honours
| identification_symbol         = Government
| identification_symbol_label   = Tartan
}}
The Prince Edward Island Highlanders was an infantry regiment of the Canadian Army. In 1946, the regiment was amalgamated with The Prince Edward Island Light Horse to form The Prince Edward Island Regiment (RCAC).

 Lineage 

 The Prince Edward Island Highlanders 

 Originated on 25 June 1875, in Charlottetown, Prince Edward Island, as the Queen's County Provisional Battalion of Infantry.
 Amalgamated on 30 June 1876, with the Charlottetown Provisional Battalion of Infantry and redesignated as the Queen's County Battalion of Infantry.
 Redesignated on 4 October 1878, as the 82nd Queen's County Battalion of Infantry.
 Redesignated on 8 May 1900, as the 82nd Queen's County Regiment.
 Redesignated on 5 June 1906, as the 82nd Abegweit Light Infantry.
 Redesignated on 29 March 1920, as The Prince Edward Island Regiment.
 Redesignated on 15 June 1927, as The Prince Edward Island Highlanders.
 Redesignated on 1 January 1941, as the 2nd (Reserve) Battalion, The Prince Edward Island Highlanders.
 Redesignated on 1 June 1945, as The Prince Edward Island Highlanders.
 Converted to armour and amalgamated on 1 April 1946, with the 17th (Reserve) Armoured Regiment (Prince Edward Island Light Horse), RCAC and redesignated as the 17th (Prince Edward Island) Reconnaissance Regiment (now The Prince Edward Island Regiment (RCAC))

 The Charlottetown Provisional Battalion of Infantry 

 Originated on 2 July 1875, in Charlottetown, Prince Edward Island, as the Charlottetown Provisional Battalion of Infantry.
 Amalgamated on 30 June 1876, with the Queen's County Provisional Battalion of Infantry and redesignated as the Queen's County Battalion of Infantry.

 Perpetuations 

 105th Battalion (Prince Edward Island Highlanders), CEF

 History 

 Early history 
Founded in 1875 as the Queen's County Provisional Battalion of Infantry, it went through several name changes, being renamed the Queen's County Battalion of Infantry in 1876, the 82nd Queen's County Battalion of Infantry in 1879, the 82nd Abegweit Light Infantry in 1906, and The Prince Edward Island Regiment in 1920. It acquired its final title in 1927.   is a Mi'kmaq word translating to 'cradled on the waves' as a reference to Prince Edward Island.

 South African War 
During the Second Boer War, the 82nd Queen's County Regiment contributed volunteers for the Canadian contingents in the field.

 First World War 
On 6 August 1914, Details from the 82nd Abegweit Light Infantry were placed on active service for local protection duties.

On 22 December 1915, the 105th Battalion (Prince Edward Island Highlanders), CEF was authorized for service and on 16 July 1916, the battalion embarked for Great Britain. After its arrival in the UK, the battalion provided reinforcements to the Canadian Corps in the field. On 24 January 1917, the battalion was amalgamated with 104th Battalion, CEF. On 12 October 1917, the 105th Battalion, CEF was officially disbanded.

 Second World War 
Parts of the regiment were placed on active service on 1 September 1939 for local protective duty and 1st Battalion was mobilized on 1 January 1941. The unit served in Newfoundland from 1941 to 1943. From 1943 to 1945, the 1st Battalion, Prince Edward Island Highlanders, served as part of the 15th Canadian Infantry Brigade Group, 6th Canadian Infantry Division in the home defence role of the west coast of Canada. In early 1945 after the need for home defence was not as great, the battalion embarked for the United Kingdom where it was disbanded shortly after arrival to provide reinforcements in the field to the First Canadian Army. A reserve battalion remained on Prince Edward Island.

 Post War 
On 1 April 1946, The Prince Edward Island Highlanders were amalgamated with the Prince Edward Island Light Horse to form the 17th (Prince Edward Island) Reconnaissance Regiment. and renamed as The Prince Edward Island Regiment (RCAC) in 1949.

 Organization 

 The Prince Edward Island Regiment (2 May 1921) 

 1st Battalion (perpetuating the 105th Battalion, CEF)
 2nd (Reserve) Battalion

 The Prince Edward Island Highlanders (15 June 1927) 

 Regimental Headquarters (Charlottetown, PEI)
 A Company (Charlottetown, PEI)
 B Company (New Wiltshire, PEI)
 C Company (Summerside, PEI)
 D Company (Montaque, PEI)

 Alliances 
 - The Black Watch (Royal Highland Regiment) (until 1946) 

 Uniform 
The Prince Edward Island Highlanders were kitted as Black Watch except for badges. Officers wore grey Balmorals in service dress and battle dress.

Battle honours

 South African War 
South Africa, 1900

 Great War 
 Arras, 1917, '18
 Ypres, 1917
 Amiens
 Hindenburg Line
 Pursuit to Mons

 Notable members 

 Daniel J. MacDonald

 See also 
 Canadian-Scottish regiment

Notes and references

Barnes, RM, The Uniforms and History of the Scottish Regiments'', London, Sphere Books Limited, 1972.

Infantry regiments of Canada
Highland & Scottish regiments of Canada
Military units and formations of Prince Edward Island
Infantry regiments of Canada in World War II
Organizations based in Charlottetown
1875 establishments in Prince Edward Island
1946 disestablishments in Canada
Military units and formations established in 1875
Military units and formations disestablished in 1946
Prince Edward Island Regiment